Köhnəqışlaq (also, Köhnə Qışlaq and Këgnakyshlak) is a village in the Agstafa Rayon of Azerbaijan.  The village forms part of the municipality of Tatlı.

References 

Populated places in Aghstafa District